is a railway station in the city of Suzaka, Nagano, Japan, operated by the private railway operating company Nagano Electric Railway.

Lines
Kitasuzaka Station is a station on the Nagano Electric Railway Nagano Line and is 15.0 kilometers from the terminus of the line at Nagano Station.

Station layout
The station consists of one ground-level side platform serving a single bi-directional track. The station is unattended.

Adjacent stations

History
It was renamed to its present name on 11 April 1960.

Passenger statistics
In fiscal 2016, the station was used by an average of 342 passengers daily (boarding passengers only).

Surrounding area

Asahigaoka Elementary School

See also
 List of railway stations in Japan

References

External links
 

Railway stations in Japan opened in 1923
Railway stations in Nagano Prefecture
Nagano Electric Railway
Suzaka, Nagano